Mait Künnap (born 23 September 1982) is an Estonian tennis player. His all-time world ranking high came on 4 August 2008 when he reached number 705, although his doubles ranking is somewhat better, having reached world number 377 on 4 July 2005.

Works at Pärnu Tennisehall as tennis trainer.

External links 
 
 
 

1982 births
Living people
Estonian male tennis players